Francisco Javier 'Javi' López Castro (born 3 March 1964 in Barcelona, Catalonia) is a Spanish retired footballer who played as a central defender, currently a manager.

Managerial statistics

References

External links

1964 births
Living people
Spanish footballers
Footballers from Barcelona
Association football defenders
Segunda División players
Segunda División B players
Tercera División players
CF Damm players
RCD Espanyol B footballers
CD Masnou players
CF Gandía players
CP Mérida footballers
Yeclano CF players
Villarreal CF players
Racing de Ferrol footballers
Spanish football managers
Segunda División managers
Segunda División B managers
Ciudad de Murcia managers
CD Castellón managers
UD Salamanca managers
Gimnàstic de Tarragona managers
Deportivo Alavés managers
Recreativo de Huelva managers
Xerez CD managers
FC Cartagena managers
Girona FC managers
CD Lugo managers
Celta de Vigo B managers